Poems is an early self-published volume of poems by William Carlos Williams. It was published in Rutherford, New Jersey in 1909.  The name William C. Williams is used for the cover and copyright notice, and W. C. Williams for the title page.  The book is printed on Old Stratford paper.

Table of contents 
 Innocence
 To Simplicity
 June
 Ballad of Time and the Peasant
 To His Lady with a Queer Name
 The Uses of Poetry
 The Quest of Happiness
 July
 Imitations
 Love
 To a Friend
 To My Better Self
 A Street Market, N. Y., 1908.
 September
 The Loneliness of Life
 Wistfull in Idleness
 On Thinking of a Distant Friend
 To a Lady
 To The Unknown Lady
 November
 On a Proposed Trip South
 The Folly of Preoccupation
 The Bewilderment of Youth
 The Bewilderment of Age
 Hymn to the Spirit of Fraternal Love
 Hymn to Perfection

References

1909 poetry books
American poetry collections
Poetry by William Carlos Williams
Self-published books